is a railway station on the Hokuriku Main Line in the city of Nomi, Ishikawa, Japan, operated by West Japan Railway Company (JR West).

Lines

Station layout
The station consists of one island platform with an elevated station building built above the platform. The station is unmanned.

Platforms

Adjacent stations

History
With the privatization of JNR on 1 April 1987, the station came under the control of JR West. The station name was changed to its present name on 14 March 2015. The name was changed to provide a closer association with the city of Nomi, as it is the only station in the city.

Passenger statistics
In fiscal 2015, the station was used by an average of 1,217 passengers daily (boarding passengers only).

Surrounding area
former Neagari Town Hall
Neagari Junior High School

See also
 List of railway stations in Japan

References

External links

  

Railway stations in Ishikawa Prefecture
Stations of West Japan Railway Company
Railway stations in Japan opened in 1912
Hokuriku Main Line
Nomi, Ishikawa